Live in Rio may refer to:
Live in Rio (James Reyne album)
Live in Rio (Earth, Wind & Fire album)
Live in Rio (Diana Krall video)
Live in Rio (RBD video)
Live in Rio Jorge Ben